Zhao Zengyi (1920 – February 27, 1993) was a People's Republic of China politician. He was born in Pingding County, Shanxi Province. He joined the Chinese Communist Party in October 1937. As a member of the Eighth Route Army during the Second Sino-Japanese War, he saw action in eastern Shanxi Province. During the second phase of the Chinese Civil War, he was active in the border region of Shanxi, Hebei, Shandong and Henan Provinces. After the creation of the People's Republic, he was sent to Kunming in Yunnan Province. He later became governor of Jiangxi Province.

External links
 阳泉市政府门户网站阳泉名人

1920 births
1993 deaths
People's Republic of China politicians from Shanxi
Chinese Communist Party politicians from Shanxi
Governors of Jiangxi
Politicians from Yangquan